The Walter Pollux is a Czechoslovakian nine-cylinder, air-cooled, radial engine, built by Walter Aircraft Engines for powering light aircraft and that first ran in 1936. The engine produces  at 1,800 rpm.

The first known use was on the Fieseler F 2 Tiger in 1934.

Variants
Pollux II
Direct drive engine
Pollux II-R
Geared engine, reduction ratio 0.666:1

Applications
Aero A.204
Avia B.122
Fieseler F2 Tiger
Praga BH-41

Engines on display
A preserved example of the Walter Pollux engine is on display at the following museum:
Prague Aviation Museum, Kbely

Specifications (Pollux II)

See also

References

1930s aircraft piston engines
Pollux
Aircraft air-cooled radial piston engines